Snug Corner is a town in the Bahamas. It is located on Acklins island.

References

Populated places in the Bahamas